MSNBC Reports (formerly MSNBC Live) is the blanket title for the daytime rolling news programming block of the American cable news channel MSNBC.

Programs under the banner are broadcast from 10:00 a.m. to 4:00 p.m. ET on weekdays, 12:00 a.m. to 4:00 p.m. ET on Saturdays, and 1:00 p.m. to 4:00 p.m. ET on Sundays.

History
MSNBC Reports is the name of several hours of straight news programming on the network (both weekdays and weekends), similar to what is known as "dayside" programming on other cable news channels. Beginning in 2009, MSNBC began to fill in these hours with more "opinionated" news programming. During the network's pivot back to hard news in 2015, the name returned during daytime hours. The brand is also used during holidays and as fill-in programming when a show ends or is canceled until a new show is ready.

The program aired at various times through the years, but most recently aired Saturdays from 2-4 pm ET, and Sundays from 3-4 pm ET until late 2014, when the program's anchor, Craig Melvin, was reassigned, seeing the end of the program.

After Andrew Lack became chairman of the NBC News Group in 2015, MSNBC began to remove opinion-driven programs from its daytime lineup in favor of more live news programming. Thomas Roberts was appointed to a new weekday time slot from 1-3 pm ET under the Live branding, beginning on March 2. Later in August 2015, MSNBC Live was extended to 1-6 pm ET, replacing the canceled The Cycle, Now with Alex Wagner, and The Ed Show.

On October 5, 2015, José Díaz-Balart's morning program, The Daily Rundown, and Tamron Hall's show of five years, NewsNation, were reverted to the Live branding, airing at 9:00 a.m. and 11:00 a.m, respectively. In July 2016, Díaz-Balart left MSNBC to begin his new duties as Saturday anchor of the NBC Nightly News. He was succeeded by Weekend Today anchor Craig Melvin. On December 15, 2016, Thomas Roberts was removed from the 3:00 p.m. hour.

In January 2017, Hallie Jackson and Katy Tur were announced as the new anchors for the 9:00 a.m. and 2:00 p.m. hours respectively. In February 2017, Tamron Hall departed from MSNBC and Today. In March 2017, MSNBC began to increase its use of NBC News branding during its daytime programming (including on sets and graphics), in order to emphasize its leverage of the division's resources.  In April 2017, Kate Snow left the network, electing to focus more on long-form reporting and her role as a Sunday anchor for the NBC Nightly News.  Steve Kornacki's 4 p.m. hour was replaced on May 8, 2017, with Deadline: White House, a new program hosted by Nicolle Wallace.

In 2020, Ali Velshi moved from the daytime lineup to weekend mornings, replacing David Gura's Up. Gura moved to a Saturday afternoon MSNBC Live block.  On March 2, 2020,  the 7 p.m. hour was filled with rotating anchors due to Chris Matthews' resignation from Hardball; this continued until the July 20 premiere of The ReidOut with Joy Reid.

On August 19, 2020, coinciding with the 2020 Democratic National Convention, MSNBC's weekday daytime lineup underwent a re-alignment: MTP Daily was moved to 1 p.m., Deadline: White House expanded to two hours, and Ayman Mohyeldin (host of Morning Joe First Look) began hosting the 3 p.m. hour. David Gura left the network in November 2020.

On March 29, 2021, as part of a wider rebranding of the channel, MSNBC rebranded most of its daytime programming under the blanket title MSNBC Reports, with the individual programs being branded with the anchor's name. The new branding was modeled after Andrea Mitchell Reports and Alex Witt Reports, and was introduced as part of an effort by new MSNBC president Rashida Jones to achieve a clearer separation between MSNBC's news-driven daytime lineup, and its pundit-based primetime programming.

On September 7, 2021, it was announced that José Díaz-Balart would return to MSNBC Reports hosting the 10 a.m. hour, while Hallie Jackson moved to the 3 p.m. hour, and Ayman Mohyeldin moved from weekdays to weekend evenings, replacing The Week with Joshua Johnson.

During 2021 and 2022, the weekend morning block of MSNBC Reports, formerly anchored by Kendis Gibson and Lindsey Reiser, was replaced by repeats of MSNBC on Peacock's Zerlina, The Mehdi Hasan Show anchored by Mehdi Hasan, as well as the launch of The Katie Phang Show, anchored by Katie Phang, which premiered on April 9, 2022.

During the week of February 28, 2022, coinciding with the 2022 State of the Union address, Craig Melvin Reports was temporarily replaced by White House Reports—which was hosted by NBC News White House correspondents Peter Alexander and Kristen Welker. On March 14, 2022, it was announced that Craig Melvin would step down from his program to focus on NBC's morning show Today as of April 1.

On April 4, 2022, Stephanie Ruhle's 9 a.m. hour was replaced with a fourth hour of MSNBC's morning show Morning Joe, after Ruhle became the new host of The 11th Hour. On May 7, 2022, the weekend block of MSNBC Reports was reduced by an hour with the premiere of Symone as a new 4 p.m. show. On June 6, 2022, MTP Daily was moved to NBC News Now as Meet the Press Now, with Chris Jansing taking over his former 1 p.m. hour.

On January 12, 2023, it was announced that Hallie Jackson would leave her 3 p.m. hour to focus on her NBC News NOW show, while Chris Jansing's 1 p.m. hour will expand to two hours, Katy Tur would move to Jackson's 3 p.m. hour, and Jose Diaz-Balart would move to Craig Melvin's former 11 a.m. hour with the changes starting on February 13.

The Sunday block of MSNBC Reports was reduced by an hour on Sunday, March 19th, with the premiere of a news-talk program hosted by former White House press secretary Jen Psaki.

List of MSNBC Reports anchors

Weekdays

Saturdays

Sundays

See also 
 CNN Newsroom
 America's Newsroom (Fox News)

References

MSNBC original programming
1996 American television series debuts
1990s American television news shows
2000s American television news shows
2010s American television news shows
2020s American television news shows
English-language television shows